2nd otdelenie sovkhoza (Russian: 2-е отделение совхоза) is a rural locality (a selo) in Gereykhanovsky Selsovet of Suleyman-Stalsky District, Russia. The population was 1265 as of 2010.

Geography 
The village is located on the left bank of the Chiragchay River, 6 km south from Kasumkent.

Streets 
 3 Internatsionala
 A. Israfilova
 Agasieva
 Belinskogo
 Buynakskogo
 V. Emirova
 Gornaya
 Dahadaeva
 E. Emina
 K. Marksa
 Lenina
 M. Gorkogo
 Makarskaya
 Mira
 Naberezhnaya
 Proletarskaya
 Pushkina
 S. Stalskogo
 Salikhova per.
 Salikhova

References 

Rural localities in Suleyman-Stalsky District